Zhao Xintong (born 3 April 1997) is a Chinese professional snooker player who is currently suspended from the World Snooker Tour. He attracted attention as a teenager, with a number of top players commenting on his potential in the sport. He joined the professional tour in 2016 and won his first ranking title and first Triple Crown title at the 2021 UK Championship, defeating Luca Brecel 10–5 in the final. With this win, he entered the top 16 in the world rankings for the first time and became eligible for his first Masters. He won his second ranking title at the 2022 German Masters when he whitewashed Yan Bingtao 9–0 in the final, becoming only the third player, after Steve Davis and Neil Robertson, to win a two-session ranking final without conceding a frame.

In January 2023, the sport's governing body suspended Zhao as part of a match-fixing investigation involving ten Chinese players. He was subsequently charged with being concerned in fixing matches on the World Snooker Tour and betting on snooker, and will face an independent disciplinary tribunal.

Career

Zhao Xintong first drew international attention in June 2012 at the Zhangjiagang Open defeating high ranking players Xiao Guodong, Irishman Kevin McMahon and Yu Delu to reach the last 16 of the tournament where he narrowly lost 4–3 to Stephen Lee. Zhao would build on this success by reaching the second round of Asian Tour Events the Yixing Open and Zhengzhou Open.

As a wildcard entrant he defeated former World Champion Ken Doherty in the International Championship to reach the last 32 of a ranking event for the first time, again narrowly losing in a final frame decider 6–5 to Matthew Stevens. Having also earned his way to the last 32 of the World Open and China Open, Zhao started gaining the reputation of the Wildcard Menace, a mantle formerly held by Kevin McMahon.

In 2013, at the International Championship, he beat six-time World Champion Steve Davis 6–1 who later commented: "This boy was astonishingly good and better than anybody I have ever seen at that age - and that includes Ronnie O'Sullivan." He went on to reach the third round of the competition before losing 6–2 to Marco Fu, however he would go on to avenge this loss by defeating Fu in the first round of the 2014 Shanghai Masters. Zhao entered the World Amateur Championship in late 2013 reaching the final, however he lost to his fellow countryman Zhou Yuelong 8–4 and thus missed out on a chance to join the world snooker main tour for the 2014–15 season.

2014–15 season
Zhao entered several events in an attempt to qualify for the 2015–16 season. He was narrowly defeated in the first round of the ACBS Asian Snooker Championship. He won three games in the first event of Q School before losing 4–3 to Alexander Ursenbacher in the penultimate round. In the second event Zhao got extremely close to qualifying for the main tour managing to reach the final round before losing 4–3 to Duane Jones in a black ball finish in the deciding frame.

2015–16 season
Zhao's high Q School Order of Merit ranking gave him entry as a top up player to many events in the 2015–16 season. He whitewashed Stuart Carrington 6–0 to qualify for the International Championship and, despite losing 6–2 to John Higgins in the first round, his effort of 142 won the high break prize for the event. Zhao made his first appearance at the UK Championship, German Masters and Welsh Open, but was knocked out in the opening round of each. He lost in the final of the 2015 IBSF World Snooker Championship 8–6 to Pankaj Advani. It meant that Zhao won a two-year card for the main tour after Advani declined the invitation.

2016–17 season

After whitewashing Wang Yuchen 4–0 at the English Open, Zhao met Ronnie O'Sullivan in the second round. Breaks of 130, 107 and 80 saw him lead 3–2, but he missed chances to take the win and was defeated 4–3. O'Sullivan said afterwards that Zhao's attacking style of play had reminded him of Stephen Hendry when he was a similar age. He qualified for the German Masters by beating Li Hang 5–3 and John Higgins 5–1 and a 5–0 thrashing of Akani Songsermsawad saw Zhao reach the last 16 of a ranking event for the first time. He held a narrow 4–3 advantage over Ali Carter, but lost the last two frames. Zhao was also edged out in the third round Gibraltar Open 4–3 by Mark Williams.

2017–18 season
He dropped off the tour at the end of the 2017–18 season but entered Q School in a bid to win back his place. He subsequently won back his place by beating Dechawat Poomjaeng in the second Event final of Q School.

2018–19 season 
Zhao bounced back after a difficult 2017–18 season, reaching his first semi-final at the China Championship early in the season, beating Matthew Stevens, Anthony McGill, Fergal O'Brien, Mark Williams, and Barry Hawkins, before losing 4–6 to Mark Selby. He also reached the quarter-finals of the Welsh Open, losing 2–5 to eventual finalist Stuart Bingham. Perhaps the biggest achievement of the season for Zhao was reaching the final stages of the World Championship for the first time, but he lost 7–10 to Selby in the first round.

2019–20 season 
Zhao maintained his form from the previous season, reaching another quarter-final in the German Masters and progressing to the last 16 in at least four other tournaments. This consistent performance elevated his world ranking to 29th by the end of the season. Ronnie O'Sullivan, Stephen Hendry, and Alan McManus have all once suggested that Zhao would become a leading player in world snooker due to his enormous potential.

2020-21 season

2021-22 season – UK Champion and breakthrough into the top 16 
In the 2021 UK Championship, Zhao claimed his first Triple Crown title, and first ranking title overall, by beating Belgian Luca Brecel 10–5, in the final. Due to this, he climbed into the Top 16 of the rankings, at number 9, becoming the Chinese number 1 player. He also qualified for the 2022 Masters, and became number 1 on the one-year ranking list. At the Masters, he played John Higgins in the first round in a repeat of prior meetings in both the World Grand Prix and the UK Championship, however, he lost 2–6.

In 2022, he reached the final of the 2022 German Masters, having defeated seasoned professionals such as Mark Williams, Tom Ford, the defending champion Judd Trump and Ricky Walden. There, he met fellow professional and countryman Yan Bingtao, whom he defeated by a whitewash of 9–0 to claim the second ranking title of his career in the space of just two months. By doing so, he became only the third player in history to whitewash a player in the final of a ranking event: the last two who did this were Steve Davis and Neil Robertson.

Performance and rankings timeline

Career finals

Ranking finals: 2 (2 titles)

Pro-am finals: 1 (1 title)

Team finals: 2 (1 title)

Amateur finals: 2

See also

References

Citations

Sources

External links

Zhao Xintong at worldsnooker.com
 Zhao Xintong at CueTracker.net: Snooker Results and Statistic Database

1997 births
Chinese snooker players
Living people
Sportspeople from Xi'an
UK champions (snooker)
21st-century Chinese people